The mediastinum (from ) is the central compartment of the thoracic cavity. Surrounded by loose connective tissue, it is an undelineated region that contains a group of structures within the thorax, namely the heart and its vessels, the esophagus, the trachea, the phrenic and cardiac nerves, the thoracic duct, the thymus and the lymph nodes of the central chest.

Anatomy

The mediastinum lies within the thorax and is enclosed on the right and left by pleurae. It is surrounded by the chest wall in front, the lungs to the sides and the spine at the back. It extends from the sternum in front to the vertebral column behind. It contains all the organs of the thorax except the lungs. It is continuous with the loose connective tissue of the neck.

The mediastinum can be divided into an upper (or superior) and lower (or inferior) part:

 The superior mediastinum starts at the superior thoracic aperture and ends at the thoracic plane.
 The inferior mediastinum from this level to the diaphragm. This lower part is subdivided into three regions, all relative to the pericardium – the anterior mediastinum being in front of the pericardium, the middle mediastinum contains the pericardium and its contents, and the posterior mediastinum being behind the pericardium.

Anatomists, surgeons, and clinical radiologists compartmentalize the mediastinum differently. For instance, in the radiological scheme of Felson, there are only three compartments (anterior, middle, and posterior), and the heart is part of the middle (inferior) mediastinum.

Thoracic plane
The transverse thoracic plane, thoracic plane, plane of Louis or plane of Ludwig is an important anatomical plane at the level of the sternal angle and the T4/T5 intervertebral disc.  It serves as an imaginary boundary that separates the superior and inferior mediastinum.

A number of important anatomical structures and transitions occur at the level of the thoracic plane, including:
 The carinal bifurcation of the trachea into the left and right main bronchi.
 The left recurrent laryngeal nerve branching off the left vagus nerve and hooking under the ligamentum arteriosum between the aortic arch above and the pulmonary trunk below.
 The starting of the cardiac plexus.
 The azygos vein arching over the right main bronchus and joining into the superior vena cava.
 The thoracic duct crossing the midline from right to left behind the esophagus
 The end of the pretracheal and prevertebral fasciae.

Superior mediastinum
The superior mediastinum is bounded:

 superiorly by the thoracic inlet, the upper opening of the thorax;
 inferiorly by the transverse thoracic plane. which is an imaginary plane passing from the sternal angle anteriorly to the lower border of the body of the 4th thoracic vertebra posteriorly;
 laterally by the pleurae;
 anteriorly by the manubrium of the sternum;
 posteriorly by the first four thoracic vertebral bodies.

Contents
 muscles
 origins of the Sternohyoidei and Sternothyreoidei
 lower ends of the Longi colli
 arteries
 aortic arch
 brachiocephalic artery
 thoracic portions of the left common carotid and the left subclavian
 veins
 brachiocephalic veins and
 upper half of the superior vena cava
 left highest intercostal vein
 nerves
 vagus nerve
 cardiac nerve
 superficial and deep cardiac plexuses
 phrenic nerve
 left recurrent laryngeal nerve
 trachea with paratracheal and tracheobronchial lymph nodes
 esophagus
 thoracic duct
 remains of the thymus
 some lymph glands
 anterior longitudinal ligament

Inferior mediastinum

Anterior inferior mediastinum
Is bounded:

 laterally by the pleurae;
 posteriorly by the pericardium;
 anteriorly by the sternum , the left transversus thoracis and the fifth, sixth, and seventh left costal cartilages.

Contents
 A quantity of loose areolar tissue
 Some lymphatic vessels which ascend from the convex surface of the liver
 Two or three anterior mediastinal lymph nodes
 The small mediastinal branches of the internal thoracic artery
 Thymus (involuted in adults)
superior and inferior sternopericardial ligaments

Middle inferior mediastinum
Bounded: pericardial sac – It contains the vital organs and is classified into the serous and fibrous pericardium.

Contents
 the heart enclosed in the pericardium
 the ascending aorta
 the lower half of the superior vena cava with the azygos vein opening into it
 the bifurcation of the trachea and the two bronchi
 the pulmonary trunk dividing into its two branches
 the right and left pulmonary veins
 the phrenic nerves
 some bronchial lymphatic glands
 pericardiocophrenic vessels

Posterior inferior mediastinum
Is bounded:
 Anteriorly by (from above downwards): bifurcation of trachea; pulmonary vessels; fibrous pericardium and posterior sloping surface of diaphragm
 Inferiorly by the thoracic surface of the diaphragm (below);
 Superiorly by the transverse thoracic plane;
 Posteriorly by the bodies of the vertebral column from the lower border of the fifth to the twelfth thoracic vertebra (behind);
 Laterally by the mediastinal pleura (on either side).

 artery
 thoracic part of the descending aorta
 veins
 azygos vein
 the hemiazygos vein and the accessory hemiazygos vein
 nerves
 vagus nerve
 splanchnic nerves
 sympathetic chain
 esophagus
 thoracic duct
 some lymph glands

Clinical significance

The mediastinum is frequently the site of involvement of various tumors:

 Anterior mediastinum: substernal thyroid goiters, lymphoma, thymoma, and teratoma.
 Middle mediastinum: lymphadenopathy, metastatic disease such as from small cell carcinoma from the lung.
 Posterior mediastinum: Neurogenic tumors, either from the nerve sheath (mostly benign) or elsewhere (mostly malignant).

Mediastinitis is inflammation of the tissues in the mediastinum, usually bacterial and due to rupture of organs in the mediastinum. As the infection can progress very quickly, this is a serious condition.

However, that does not always occur and sometimes those conditions  are actually the cause, not the result, of pneumomediastinum. These conditions frequently accompany Boerhaave syndrome, or spontaneous esophageal rupture.

Widening

Widened mediastinum/mediastinal widening is where the mediastinum has a width greater than 6 cm on an upright PA chest X-ray or 8 cm on supine AP chest film.

A widened mediastinum can be indicative of several pathologies:

 aortic aneurysm
 aortic dissection
 aortic unfolding
 aortic rupture
 hilar lymphadenopathy
 anthrax inhalation - a widened mediastinum was found in 7 of the first 10 victims infected by anthrax (Bacillus anthracis) in 2001.
esophageal rupture - presents usually with pneumomediastinum and pleural effusion. It is diagnosed with water-soluble swallowed contrast.
mediastinal mass
mediastinitis
cardiac tamponade
pericardial effusion
thoracic vertebrae fractures in trauma patients.

See also
 Mediastinum testis (unrelated structure in the scrotum)
 Mediastinal germ cell tumor
 Mediastinitis
 Mediastinal tumor
 List of anatomy mnemonics#Mediastinum

References

External links 

  – "Divisions of the mediastinum."
  – "The anatomical divisions of the inferior mediastinum."
  – "Subdivisions of the Thoracic Cavity"

Thoracic cavity